Kim Yujin (The romanization preferred by the author according to LTI Korea) (born 1981) is a South Korean writer.

Life 
Kim Yujin was born in Seoul in 1981.  She graduated in creative writing from Myongji University. She began her literary career when her short story The Mark of the Wolf (늑대의 문장) won the Munhakdongne New Writer Award. She was awarded the 2nd Munhakdongne Young Writer’s Award in 2011, and the 2nd Sonagi Village – Hwang Soonone Literature Prize in 2013. She has published a short story collection The Mark of the Wolf (늑대의 문장), and a novel Sumeun bam (숨은 밤 The Hidden Night).

Writing 
Kim Yujin’s early works contain apocalyptic imagination. The apocalypse is based on artistic imagination that bemoans the brevity of daily life, attempts to figure out a path of transcendence, or arrange the probability for recombination. Kim Yujin’s apocalypse leads to exploration on the feminine world. For instance, in “Eojae” (어제 Yesterday), she portrayed the story of women who attempts to escape the life in an anchored laundry boat and go into an unknown future. In “The Mark of the Wolf” (늑대의 문장) and “The Witch” (마녀), she tells a story of girls who leave civilization in favor of primitive times, and a story of beings that travels beyond the world of death. 

Her writing changes from her second collection, Yeoreum (여름 Summer). Unlike her early works, in which she displayed her imagination for escape, exploring the possibility of a completely new world while leaving behind the current one and its order, her new works show detailed study into the present life. Now, Kim Yujin focuses on what is normal and everyday. Without showing much emotion, she portrays daily life in a calm and dull manner, showing a subtle side of the human mind that cannot be reduced to words. Also, she explains that life, is a time when one learns how to accept not understanding, how to let go of something that can’t be gotten, and how to speak without any emotions if one cannot let go or forget what they desire.

Works   

 Badasseugi (받아쓰기 Dictation) 
 Yeoreum (여름 Summer)
 Sumeun bam (숨은 밤 The Hidden Night) 
 The Mark of the Wolf (늑대의 문장)

Awards 
 Sonagi Village – Hwang Soonone Literature Prize, 2013.
 Munhakdongne Young Writer’s Award, 2011.

References 

Living people
1981 births